The Real was an American syndicated talk show created by SallyAnn Salsano (495 Productions). The series initially received a trial run on Fox-owned markets in the summer of 2013 and premiered for full syndication in 2014. It was last co-hosted by singer and actress Adrienne Bailon, comedian and actress Loni Love, television host and fashion stylist Jeannie Mai, and actress and model Garcelle Beauvais.

Production
In the summer of 2013, it was announced that the series would be tested on seven Fox-owned stations in New York, Los Angeles, Washington D.C., Philadelphia, Phoenix, Houston and Tampa. In October 2013, it was announced that The Real would be nationally syndicated beginning September 15, 2014.

In February 2015, Warner Bros. announced the series had been renewed for a second season. In October 2015, the series was renewed for a third and fourth seasons, allowing it to air through 2018. The program switched to broadcasting live in its fourth season, allowing viewers "a seat at the table" starting September 2017.

In January 2018, the series was renewed for a fifth and sixth season. In November 2019, the series was renewed for a seventh and eighth season through the 2021–2022 television season.

SallyAnn Salsano, who created the show, was executive producer along with Rachel Miskowiec until 2015, when Miskowiec took over; In August 2021, Tenia Watson was announced as the new executive producer for the eighth season. The show is produced by 495 Productions and Telepictures Productions and distributed by Warner Bros. Domestic Television Distribution.

On April 8, 2022, it was reported that The Real had been cancelled and the eighth season would be its last. Production costs due to COVID-19 have been attributed to the show's cancellation. The final episode aired on June 3. Reruns from the final season of The Real to air until September 2.

Co-hosts

The original panel of The Real comprised five co-hosts: actress Tamera Mowry, television host Jeannie Mai, singer and television personality Tamar Braxton, actress and singer Adrienne Bailon and comedian and actress Loni Love. Braxton announced her departure on May 22, 2016. Throughout 2019, actress and comedian Amanda Seales served as a frequent guest co-host. In January 2020, Seales became a permanent co-host during the series' sixth season. The following June, Seales exited the series, citing her dissatisfaction with the inability to openly speak on recent social issues as a reason, along with a lack of minority executive staff within Telepictures. The following month, Mowry-Housley announced her departure. In August, actress Garcelle Beauvais was announced as a permanent addition to the panel for season 7.

Notable episodes
The Real celebrated its 100th episode on February 24, 2015. In January 2016, the co-hosts traveled to Washington, D.C. to visit The White House and First Lady Michelle Obama. In addition to granting an interview, The First Lady and the co-hosts spoke to high schoolers about college. On April 30, 2018, The Real held a celebratory episode following their win at the 45th Daytime Emmy Awards one day before. The series celebrated the airing of its 1,000th episode on February 17, 2020.

Awards and nominations

References

External links
 
 
 

2013 American television series debuts
2022 American television series endings
2010s American black television series
2010s American television talk shows
2020s American television talk shows
2020s American black television series
English-language television shows
First-run syndicated television programs in the United States
Television series by Telepictures
Television series by Warner Bros. Television Studios
Television shows filmed in California
Women's mass media